Totally Nickelodeon was an interactive game show theater inspired by the Nickelodeon channel's game shows, and was located in the Upper Lot area at Universal Studios Hollywood. The attraction opened in 1997, replacing Flintstones Musical Revue. The show consisted of two teams of audience members competing on-stage in three games. It closed in 2000 to make way for Rugrats Magic Adventure.

Queue 
A host would ask guests trivia about Nickelodeon shows. Most guests that answered correctly could pie a family member, while a specific few were allowed to participate in the game show.

Show 
Once inside the theatre, additional audience members would be chosen to participate in the game show. This involved a pre-recorded safety video featuring Nickelodeon's Stick Stickley character.

Games that were included in the rotation of three games for the attraction:

 Crossing an aerial bridge
 Collecting socks
 The "Pie Pod" from What Would You Do?
 Collecting plush toys in Rugrats-themed high chairs
 Assembling a TV Dinner by throwing food
 Building a Good Burger
 Rescuing Alex Mack
 A Family Double Dare-themed slide
 A Nickelodeon Guts-themed game
 An All That-themed game
 A Hey Arnold!-themed game

The show also consisted of non-competitive scenarios, such as a contestant simply getting "slimed". The finale of the show featured a massive Nickelodeon blimp, with a connection to a reactor that led to a "slime overload", which involved one of the contestants getting slimed and green confetti showering the audience.

References

Former Universal Studios Hollywood attractions
Amusement rides introduced in 1997
Amusement rides that closed in 2000